The sigma-1 receptor (σ1R), one of two sigma receptor subtypes, is a chaperone protein  at the endoplasmic reticulum (ER) that modulates calcium signaling through the IP3 receptor.  In humans, the σ1 receptor is encoded by the SIGMAR1 gene.

The σ1 receptor is a transmembrane protein expressed in many different tissue types. It is particularly concentrated in certain regions of the central nervous system. It has been implicated in several phenomena, including cardiovascular function, schizophrenia, clinical depression, the effects of cocaine abuse, and cancer. Much is known about the binding affinity of hundreds of synthetic compounds to the σ1 receptor.

An endogenous ligand for the σ1 receptor has yet to be conclusively identified, but tryptaminergic trace amines and neuroactive steroids have been found to activate the receptor. Especially progesterone, but also testosterone, pregnenolone sulfate, and dehydroepiandrosterone sulfate (DHEA-S) bind to the σ1 receptor.

Characteristics 
The σ1 receptor is defined by its unique pharmacological profile. In 1976 Martin reported that the effects of N-allylnormetazocine (SKF-10,047) could not be due to activity at the μ and κ receptors (named from the first letter of their selective ligands morphine and ketazocine, respectively) and a new type of opioid receptor was proposed; σ (from the first letter of SKF-10,047).  The opioid classification was eventually dropped however resulting from it not possessing the canonical opioid G-protein coupled receptor structure and the receptor was later referred to as simply  the σ1 receptor. It was found to have affinity for the (+)-stereoisomers of several benzomorphans (e.g., (+)-pentazocine and (+)-cyclazocine), as well as various structurally and pharmacologically distinct psychoactive chemicals such as haloperidol and cocaine, and neuroactive steroids like progesterone.
Pharmacological studies with σ1 agonists often follow a bell-shaped dose-response curve. Thus care should be taken when designing experiments and choosing doses of ligands.

Structure 
The mammalian σ1 receptor is an integral membrane protein with 223 amino acids. It shows no homology to other mammalian proteins but strikingly shares 30% sequence identity and  69%  similarity with  the ERG2 gene product of yeast, which is  a  C8-C7 sterol  isomerase in the ergosterol biosynthetic pathway. Hydropathy analysis of the σ1 receptor indicates three hydrophobic regions. A crystal structure of the σ1 receptor was published in 2016.

Functions 
A variety of specific physiological functions have been attributed to the σ1 receptor. Chief among these are modulation of Ca2+ release, modulation of cardiac myocyte contractility, and inhibition of voltage gated K+ channels. The reasons for these effects are not well understood, even though σ1 receptors have been linked circumstantially to a wide variety of signal transduction pathways. Links between σ1 receptors and G-proteins have been suggested such as  σ1 receptor antagonists showing GTP-sensitive high-affinity binding; there is also, however, some evidence against a G-protein coupled hypothesis. The σ1 receptor has been shown to appear in a complex with voltage gated K+ channels (Kv1.4 and Kv1.5), leading to the idea that σ1 receptors are auxiliary subunits. σ1 receptors apparently co-localize with IP3 receptors on the endoplasmic reticulum where theymay be involved in preventing endoplasmic reticulum stress in neurodegenerative diseases. Also, σ1 receptors have been shown to appear in galactoceramide enriched domains at the endoplasmic reticulum of mature oligodendrocytes. The wide scope and effect of ligand binding on σ1 receptors has led some to believe that σ1 receptors are intracellular signal transduction amplifiers.

Recently, σ1R has been implicated in autophagosome formation  and maturation. Autophagy is a broad homeostatic, metabolic, cytoplasmic quality control, and metabolic process affecting many functions in the cell. σ1R is targeted by the nsp6 protein of SARS-CoV-2 to inhibit autophagosome formation  as a process competing with the coronavirus for cellular endomembranes that the virus needs for its own replication. This along with the observed beneficial effects of sigma-1 receptor agonist and SSRI fluvoxamine in patients with SARS-COV-2 infection has led to the hypothesis that the sigma-1 receptor could be a target for the treatment of SARS-COV-2.

There has been much interest in the sigma-1 receptor and its role in age-related neurodegenerative diseases such as Alzheimer's disease. During healthy ageing, the density of sigma-1 receptors has been to increase. However, in diseases such as Alzheimer's disease, there appears to be a reduction in sigma-1 receptor expression. It has been suggested that targeting the sigma-1 receptor along with other receptors could increase neuron survival and function in neurodegenerative disease. The activation of autophagy has also been suggested as a downstream mechanism linked to sigma-1 receptor activation.

Knockout mice 
σ1 receptor knockout mice were created in 2003 to study the effects of endogenous DMT. Strangely, the mice demonstrated no overt phenotype. As expected, however, they did lack locomotor response to the σ ligand (+)-SKF-10,047 and displayed reduced response to formalin induced pain. Speculation has focused on the ability of other receptors in the σ family (e.g., σ2, with similar binding properties) to compensate for the lack of σ1 receptor.

Clinical significance 
Mutations in sigma-1 receptor have been associated with distal spinal muscular atrophy type 2.

Ligands 

The following ligands have high affinity for the σ1 receptor and possess high binding selectivity over the subtype σ2:

Agonists:
 PRE-084
 ANAVEX2-73
 Donepezil
 Selegiline
 D-Deprenyl
 Fluvoxamine
 Fluoxetine
 Citalopram
 Amitriptyline
 L-687,384
 SA-4503
 Dipentylamine
 Dextromethorphan
 Dimethyltryptamine
 (+)-pentazocine (the "unnatural" enantiomer, which lacks affinity for the μ-opioid and κ-opioid receptors.)
 Opipramol

Antagonists:
Sertraline
 S1RA
FTC-146
 1-benzyl-6′-methoxy-6′,7′-dihydrospiro[piperidine-4,4′-thieno[3.2-c]pyran]: putative antagonist, selective against 5-HT1A, 5-HT6, 5-HT7, α1A and α2 adrenergic, and NMDA receptors
 NE-100
Positive allosteric modulators (PAMs):
 Methylphenylpiracetam
 SOMCL-668

Uncategorized:
 4-IPBS
 PD 144418
 spipethiane
 RHL-033
 3-[[1-[(4-chlorophenyl)methyl]-4-piperidyl]methyl]-1,3-benzoxazol-2-one: very high affinity and subtype selectivity
 1'-[(4-fluorophenyl)methyl]spiro[1H-isobenzofuran-3,4'-piperidine]
 1'-benzyl-6-methoxy-1-phenyl-spiro[6H-furo[3,4-c]pyrazole-4,4'-piperidine]
 (−)-(S)-4-methyl-1-[2-(4-chlorophenoxy)-1-methylethyl]piperidine

Agents exist that have high σ1 affinity but either lack subtype selectivity or have high affinity at other binding sites, thus being more or less dirty/multifunctional, like haloperidol. Furthermore, there is a wide range of agents with an at least moderate σ1 involvement in their binding profile.

See also 
 Sigma-2 receptor

References

External links